Man About Town is a 1939 musical comedy film starring Jack Benny, Dorothy Lamour, and Edward Arnold. The screenplay concerns a producer who tries to get his leading lady to take him seriously romantically by pursuing other women.

Then-Sen. Harry S. Truman saw the movie in Washington, and wrote in a letter home to his wife that he enjoyed it.

Cast
Jack Benny as Bob Temple
Dorothy Lamour as Diana Wilson
Edward Arnold as Sir John Arlington
Binnie Barnes as Lady Arlington
Monty Woolley as Henri Dubois
Isabel Jeans as Mme. Dubois
Phil Harris as Ted Nash
Betty Grable as Susan Hayes
E. E. Clive as Hotchkiss
Eddie Anderson as Rochester
The Merriel Abbott Dancers as Themselves
Matty Malneck and His Orchestra as Themselves
The Pina Troupe as Themselves
Charles Coleman as Hotel Doorman (uncredited)
Cecil Kellaway as Headwaiter (uncredited)
Cliff Severn as English Bellboy (uncredited)

References

External links

1939 films
1939 musical comedy films
1939 romantic comedy films
American black-and-white films
American musical comedy films
American romantic comedy films
1930s English-language films
Films about musical theatre
Films directed by Mark Sandrich
Films set in country houses
Films set in London
Paramount Pictures films
1930s American films